Càrcer is a municipality in the comarca of Ribera Alta in the Valencian Community, Spain.

Infrastructure

Education
With a population near 2.120, Càrcer has a public school's Pare Gumilla, and  Cárcer High School. The village also has a music school (Unió Musical Càrcer)

Hospitals
The village has the Centre de salut Càrcer (Medical Center) and is near from Alzira Hospital and Hospital Lluís Alcanyís de Xàtiva

Notable people
 José Gumilla, a Jesuit priest who wrote a natural history of the Orinoco River region

References

Municipalities in the Province of Valencia
Ribera Alta (comarca)